Pharsalia ochreopunctata is a species of beetle in the family Cerambycidae. It was described by Ernst Fuchs in 1957.

References

ochreopunctata
Beetles described in 1957